Eddie Moussa (20 March 1984 – 1 July 2010) was a professional football player. He carried both Swedish and Lebanese citizenship, and was of Assyrian descent.

Club career
He played in Sweden for Assyriska Föreningen during his career starting 2001 until his death, with one year as loan to Valsta Syrianska IK for the season 2006–2007. He played as an attacking midfielder or forward.

International career
As his father was Assyrian from Lebanon while his mother from Syria, he had acquired Lebanese citizenship to possibly play in the Lebanese national team.

Death
At 2:22 am on 1 July 2010, Eddie Moussa, his brother Yaacoub and another person were shot in Café Oasen in Södertälje, Sweden, According to witnesses, three men came into the premises and began shooting. They then escaped on their scooters. Eddie and his brother Yaacoub Moussa died while their friend was seriously injured.

References

1984 births
2010 deaths
Swedish people of Lebanese descent
Swedish people of Assyrian/Syriac descent
Sportspeople of Lebanese descent
People from Södertälje
Swedish footballers
Assyrian footballers
Association football forwards
Assyriska FF players
Superettan players
Male murder victims
Swedish murder victims
People murdered in Sweden
Deaths by firearm in Sweden
Sportspeople from Stockholm County